The Philadelphia Shakespeare Festival is an annual Shakespearean theatre festival in Philadelphia.  Every year, The Festival produces two or three productions of Shakespeare's plays.  Starting out as the Red Heel Theatre in 1989, and changing name and purpose in 1993, The Philadelphia Shakespeare Festival is now the region's only theatre devoted entirely to Shakespeare's works. In 2008/9, they engaged in intensive planning with the board of directors and cultural and community leaders and decided to re-brand and rename the company to better reflect their programming. The Philadelphia Shakespeare Theatre now has several programs for adults and students including a lecture series featuring world-renowned Shakespeare scholars, Shakespeare School Tour which also tours in schools, and a Classical Acting Academy providing early career actors with intense classical training culminating in a free summer Shakespeare play for the public.

In Summer 2008, The City Council of Philadelphia passed a resolution honoring The Theatre for excellence in performance and educational programming, recognizing the impact The Theatre has made on Philadelphia's cultural landscape and particularly on its students.

Open Door Project
The Open Door Project, which is The Festival's educational outreach and includes school matinees and Artist-in-Residence programs, comprises more than a third of the overall performances of the entire Festival.  Thousands of students come to see The Festival every year as part of the school matinees, many of whom take part in the Artist-in-Residence program, which places actors in classrooms to teach the students about Shakespeare's work.   In addition, The Philadelphia Shakespeare Festival creates its own original curriculum for each play they produce.

Young Professionals Company
Technically part of the Open Door Project, the Young Professionals Company is a sort of training ground for up and coming actors new to the Philadelphia theatre community.  Since they started in 2003, the company has continued to produce plays which are free to the public. Now known as the Classical Acting Academy, it offers the same great opportunities for young actors and the audiences.

Shakespeare Café
The Shakespeare Café is a new program being introduced in the 2007 season.  Following the trend of trying to make Shakespeare more digestible, this is The Festival's new, less formal show featuring shows based on the Bard's work.  They plan to have an improvisation comedy show with ComedySportz as well as a jazz performance by Arpeggio Jazz Quartet and a new play featuring Shakespeare's fights.

Past Festivals
2008 Romeo and Juliet, Pericles, Prince of Tyre

2007 Othello, The Taming of the Shrew

2006 The Tempest, Much Ado About Nothing, The Complete Works of William Shakespeare (Abridged) 

2005 Hamlet, As You Like It

2004 Julius Caesar, The Complete Works of William Shakespeare (Abridged)

2003 Othello, Macbeth

2002 A Midsummer Night's Dream, King Lear, Cymbeline

2001 Twelfth Night, Measure for Measure, Romeo and Juliet

2000 The Taming of the Shrew, The Winter's Tale, Hamlet

External links
 The Festival Site
 Theatre Alliance of Greater Philadelphia
 Philadex

Philadelphia Shakespeare Festival, The
Shakespeare Festival, Philadelphia